"Flyaway" is the title of the second album by the Christian trio Nutshell.

Track listing

Side one
 "Walking into the Wind"
 "Sara"
 "Moonlight"
 "Conversation Pieces"
 "Flyaway"

Side two
 "Feel Like a River"
 "Safe and Sound"
 "For Each Other"
 "Bedsitter / Sometimes"

all songs by Paul Field

Personnel
Paul Field -vocals, guitar, piano
Pam Thiele - vocals, autoharp
Heather Barlow - vocals
Mike Giles - drums
John G. Perry - bass
Rod Edwards - piano, electric piano, clavinet, synthesizer
Tony Carr - percussion

Production notes
Produced by Jon Miller, Rod Edwards and Roger Hand
Engineered by Dave Harris
Re-mix engineer Roger Wake
Recorded at Sound Associates Studios, London, Morgan Studios, London

1977 albums
Nutshell (band) albums